Etropus rimosus, the gray flounder, is a species of flounder in the large-tooth flounder family Paralichthyidae. It is native to the western Atlantic Ocean, ranging from the coast of North Carolina to the south of Florida. It can also be found in the eastern Gulf of Mexico.

Like the rest of the large-tooth flounders, it has both eyes on the left side of its head.

References

Etropus rimosus. FishBase. Accessed October 10, 2009

Paralichthyidae
Fish of the Gulf of Mexico
Fauna of the Southeastern United States
Fish described in 1885